Bebearia severini is a butterfly in the family Nymphalidae. It is found from Cameroon to the Democratic Republic of the Congo (Ubangi, Mongala, Uele, northern Kivu, Tshopo and Sankuru).

References

Butterflies described in 1897
severini
Butterflies of Africa
Taxa named by Per Olof Christopher Aurivillius